Reorus Torkillus (1608–1643) was priest of the Church of Sweden and the first Lutheran clergyman to settle in what would become the United States.

Biography
Torkillus was born at Mölndal, near Gothenburg,  Sweden in 1608. He studied for the ministry at Lidköping and Skara in Sweden.  After completing his education, he served as a chaplain and lecturer at the high school in Gothenburg.

Torkillus sailed with the second expedition of Swedish settlers to New Sweden, aboard the Kalmar Nyckel.  He arrived at Fort Christina  near present-day Wilmington, Delaware on April 17, 1640. Initially, Torkillus officiated at church services held in a blockhouse at Fort Christina. Planning for and construction of the first log churches in the New Sweden settlement was probably begun during his tenure.   Torkillus died at Fort Christina in 1643 and was succeeded in his pastorship to the New Sweden colonists by John Campanius.

Today Holy Trinity Church, also known as Old Swedes',  is a National Historic Landmark. It was built from local blue granite and Swedish bricks that had been used as ship's ballast on the site of the Fort Christina's burial ground. The church is stated to be the nation's oldest church building still standing as originally built. Lutheran services were held in the Swedish language well into the 18th century.

References

Further reading
Johnson, Amandus The Swedish Settlements on the Delaware Volume I: Their History and Relation to the Indians, Dutch and English, 1638-1664.  (Philadelphia, PA: The Swedish Colonial Society. 1911)
McCullough, John W. Sacred Reminiscences in the Old Swedes' Church (Wilmington, Del.: Printed by Porter & Naff, 1842)
Benson, Adolph B. and Naboth Hedin, eds. Swedes in America, 1638-1938 (The Swedish American Tercentenary Association. New Haven, CT: Yale University Press. 1938)

Other sources

 
 
 
 

17th-century American Lutheran clergy
17th-century Swedish Lutheran priests
Lutheranism in Delaware
People from Gothenburg
People of New Sweden
1608 births
1643 deaths
Swedish emigrants to the United States
Religious leaders from Delaware
Church of Sweden clergymen in Colonial North America